Achérif Ag Mohamed was a candidate in the 2013 Malian presidential election. He was nominated by the National Union for Labor and Development.

References

Malian politicians
Living people
Year of birth missing (living people)
21st-century Malian people